Ata Jesse "AJ" Inia (born 25 April 2000) is a Tongan footballer who currently plays for Navy of the Thai League 3.  

Upon joining Angkor Tiger of the Cambodian Premier League in 2020, Inia became Tonga's first-ever professional footballer.

Club career 
Inia played for the Melbourne Knights of Australia's NPL Victoria from 2018. He competed with the team in the 2019 FFA Cup, including a Round of 32 match against Adelaide United of the A-League. In 2019, Star Weekly noted that "a delicious cross" by Inia resulting in a goal "provided a glimpse into Inia's bright future".

Ata Inia signed with Angkor Tiger of the Cambodian Premier League at the end of 2020 after having tested with the club, the Angkor Tiger’s rushed to secure the signature of the “lightning fast Tongan winger” making him Tonga's first-ever professional footballer. In June 2021, Khmer Times reported that "Tongan standout Inia" was part of the club's "talented lineup". The publication also reported that Inia was also the first player of Tongan descent to play in the Kingdom" of Cambodia. 

On July 12, 2021, Inia scored his first goal in Cambodia, playing in the position of striker, as Angkor Tiger recorded its sixth straight win in the MCL. Inia equalized in a match against Boeung Ket Angkor FC on November 13, 2021, which ended 1–1.

In December 2021, Inia decided to move his talents to the Thai League, joining Trang FC of the Thai League 3 in a direct transfer from the Angkor Tiger.  In late February 2022 he re-joined Caroline Springs George Cross FC of the Victorian State League 1. That season he scored one goal in the league.

International career 
Born in Melbourne, Australia, Inia was a candidate for the Australia under-23 team for the 2020 AFC U-23 Championship after representing them in U-18 level, but withdrew due to a change of heart. He later expressed keen interest in representing the homeland of his father and grand parents, stating he would like to play with  Tonga at senior level. 

Inia has not yet featured for any Tongan national side.

References

External links
 AJ Inia at Oceania Football Center
 
 Ata Inia at Melbourne Knights FC (2019) on YouTube

2000 births
Living people
Australian soccer players
Tongan footballers
Association football midfielders
Expatriate footballers in Cambodia
Angkor Tiger FC players
Australian sportspeople of Tongan descent
Soccer players from Melbourne
Australian expatriate sportspeople in Cambodia
Australian expatriate soccer players
Australian expatriate sportspeople in Thailand
Expatriate footballers in Thailand